Industrial Silence is the debut album by Norwegian alternative rock band Madrugada. The album contains the singles "Electric", "Higher" and "Beautyproof" plus live favourite "Vocal".

A limited edition featuring a second disc containing three songs was initially released alongside the album.

A fully remastered, Deluxe edition of the album was released on 5 July 2010.  Disc 2 included all tracks from the early EP's, B-sides and four previously unheard demo recordings.  The remaster was carried out by Greg Calbi at Sterling Sound in New York.

As of 2002 the album has sold 250,000 copies according to Billboard magazine.

Track listing

Personnel
 Robert S. Burås - guitars, harmonica
 Sivert Høyem - vocals
 Frode Jacobsen - bass guitar
 Jon Lauvland Pettersen - drums, percussion

Certifications

References

1999 debut albums
Virgin Records albums
Madrugada (band) albums
Albums produced by John Agnello